Psophus is a monotypic genus of grasshopper of the family Acrididae, subfamily Oedipodinae and in the tribe Locustini.

Species
 Psophus stridulus (Linnaeus, 1758)

References

 Biolib

Acrididae genera
Oedipodinae
Taxa named by Franz Xaver Fieber
Monotypic Orthoptera genera